Ann-Marie Theresa Cording (née Devally) (born 1959), is a female former athlete who competed for England.

Athletics career
Cording was a two times National champion after winning the 1980 and 1981 AAA National Championships in the high jump. She represented England in the high jump event, at the 1982 Commonwealth Games in Brisbane, Queensland, Australia.

References

1959 births
English female high jumpers
Athletes (track and field) at the 1982 Commonwealth Games
Living people
Commonwealth Games competitors for England